Bokobá is a locality and the municipal seat of its homonymous municipality in the Mexican state of Yucatán.

Etymology
Bokobá is a term in the Yucatec Maya language, which means "splashing water".

History
Prior to the conquest, Bokobá was located within the provinces of Ceh Pech and after the conquest and became part of the encomienda system. In 1700, the encomendero was Esteban Pérez Montiel, who was responsible for 481 native inhabitants.

Yucatán declared its independence from the Spanish Crown in 1821 and in 1825, the area was assigned to the coastal region with its headquarters in Izamal. In 1900 it was withdrawn and became head of the municipality which bears its name.

Demographics

Local festivals
Every year on 15 August a festival is held in honor of Our Lady of the Assumption.

Tourist attractions
 Our Lady of the Assumption Church
 Hacienda Mucuyché Campos

References

Municipality seats in Yucatán
Populated places in Yucatán